The 2018–19 Elon Phoenix men's basketball team represented Elon University during the 2018–19 NCAA Division I men's basketball season. The Phoenix, led by tenth-year head coach Matt Matheny, played as fifth-year members of the Colonial Athletic Association and played their home games at the brand new Schar Center.

Previous season
The Phoenix finished the 2017–18 season 14–18, 6–12 in CAA play to finish in a four-way tie for seventh place. They lost in the first round of the CAA tournament to Delaware.

This was the final season that Elon played their home games at Alumni Gym.

Offseason

Departures

2018 recruiting class

Roster

Schedule and results

|-
!colspan=9 style=| Exhibition 

|-
!colspan=9 style=| Non-conference regular season 

|-
!colspan=9 style=| CAA regular season

|-
!colspan=9 style=| CAA tournament

Source:

References

Elon Phoenix men's basketball seasons
Elon
Elon
Elon